The Bear Lake Mounds Archeological District is a U.S. historic district (designated as such on November 5, 1996) located north of Flamingo, Florida, east of Bear Lake.

It suffered extensive damaged from Hurricane Wilma on October 24, 2005, and it, as well as the trail and surrounding boardwalk has been closed to the public since then.

The trail to Bear Lake was reopened in March 2008 to foot and bicycle traffic.

References

External links
 Monroe County listings at National Register of Historic Places

Archaeological sites in Monroe County, Florida
National Register of Historic Places in Monroe County, Florida
Historic districts on the National Register of Historic Places in Florida
National Register of Historic Places in Everglades National Park
Mounds in Florida
1996 establishments in Florida